Halaj (also Romanized as Ḩalaj; also known as Khalaj) is a village in Margavar Rural District, Silvaneh District, Urmia County, West Azerbaijan Province, Iran. At the 2006 census, its population was 1,088, in 177 families.

References 

Populated places in Urmia County